Ling Peigeng (born 25 October 1912, date of death unknown) was a Chinese athlete. He competed in the men's discus throw at the 1936 Summer Olympics.

References

1912 births
Year of death missing
Athletes (track and field) at the 1936 Summer Olympics
Chinese male discus throwers
Olympic athletes of China
Place of birth missing